Lunawanna is a small township on the western side of Bruny Island, Tasmania, facing the D'Entrecasteaux Channel.

Lunawanna is in the federal electorate of Franklin, the Tasmanian House of Assembly division of Franklin, and the Tasmanian Legislative Council division of Huon. The Bruny Island local council amalgamated with Kingborough council in 1994 and Lunawanna is located in the Kingborough Council local government area.

Mrs Lue Lunawanna (Granddaughter of Eddie Lunawanna) wanted the State Government to name a small region on South Bruny after Mr Lunawanna to remember the Aboriginal people of Bruny Island and their traditions. At this time, European settlement on Bruny Island had caused these traditions to dissipate.

Lunawanna has a public toilet at the community hall, a jetty, and a post box. Bruny Island Premium Wines is located at Lunawanna. The closest food store, post office, and police station are located in Alonnah,  to the north.

On the last Saturday evening of every month an amateur talent night (the Lunawanna Jamboree - until 2015 named Hoppy's Jamboree, in honour of its founder) is held in the Lunawanna Memorial hall.

History
Daniel's Bay Post Office opened on 1 April 1899, was renamed Lunawanna in 1907 and closed in 1971. In the past there was a sawmill at Daniels Bay, later relocated to "Ventnor" on Little Taylor's Bay, and another at "Out the Back", near the Cloudy Bay Road, on the eastern side of Lunawanna. At Ventenat Point, on the western shore of Little Taylor's Bay, sandstone was quarried and shipped to Hobart and Melbourne between 1860 and 1872.

Current industries include tourist accommodation, oyster farming (on Little Taylor's Bay), and pig farming and an apple orchard (both on the eastern side of Lunawanna).

References

Towns in Tasmania
Bruny Island